Jamaica–Malaysia relations refers to bilateral foreign relations between Jamaica and Malaysia. Neither country has a resident ambassador.

Both Prime Minister of Jamaica Portia Simpson Miller and Prime Minister of Malaysia Abdullah Ahmad Badawi, have expressed satisfaction with the progress of bilateral relations between the two countries and have reaffirmed their commitment to strengthening these relations through the exchange of visits and co-operation in the economic, technological, shipping, health and educational sectors, among other areas. Both countries are also the members of Commonwealth of Nations, Group of 77, Group of 15 and Non-Aligned Movement.

Economic relations 
In 1995, Jamaican exports to Malaysia worth around $18,570 while Malaysian exports to Jamaica with $3 million. A number of Malaysian investors also had started to explore any opportunities in Jamaica especially in tourism and other industry. Both countries has agreed to explore a joint-venture in oil and gas industry and has working together in the construction of Highway 2000 that connects Kingston, Jamaica with Montego Bay. While in sports, Malaysia has keen to get a coaches from Jamaica for several sports such as in netball, hockey and badminton.

Further reading 
 Speech by the Prime Minister of Jamaica at the official dinner in honour of the Prime Minister of Malaysia Jamaica Information Service

References 

 
Malaysia
Bilateral relations of Malaysia
Malaysia
Jamaica